Jonjoe Kenny (born 15 March 1997) is an English professional footballer who plays as a right-back for Bundesliga club Hertha BSC. He came through the youth system of Everton, where he had been a professional since July 2014.

Club career
Kenny signed on loan for League One side Wigan Athletic on 21 July 2015. Having played seven times for the first team, he returned to Everton at the end of the loan, despite Wigan manager Gary Caldwell expressing a desire to extend the deal. On 27 January 2016, Kenny joined Oxford United of League Two, initially on a one-month loan, later extended to the end of the season.

He made his Premier League debut for Everton, coming on as a substitute for Matthew Pennington against Norwich City, on 15 May 2016. His second Premier League appearance was again as a substitute, for Mason Holgate against Swansea City on 6 May 2017.

Kenny began the 2017/18 season as fourth choice under Ronald Koeman, however soon impressed when given his chance. He made his first Premier League start on 22 October at home to Arsenal in a 5–2 defeat. Following Koeman's sacking, he made 13 consecutive starts in the league, playing in 16 out of 19 games from October until the return of Seamus Coleman in January. He played 25 games in all competitions.

The following season began with Kenny as back up to Coleman, before impressing as the Irishman suffered with a foot injury. He played four Premier League games in a row. Following the win away to Leicester on 6 October, he was dropped out of the starting XI and didn't play again until New Year's Day, again against Leicester, this time in a 1–0 defeat. He kept his place for an FA Cup 3rd round win over Lincoln City. He returned the XI on 28 January in a 1–0 victory over Huddersfield Town, coming on as a makeshift left back for the final 20 minutes, following an injury to Leighton Baines and a red card for his substitute Lucas Digne. He continued at left back against Wolves four days later, coming on for Leighton Baines on the 20th minute. After impressing, he played the following two matches against Man City and Watford in which he picked up the Man of the Match award.

Kenny signed for Bundesliga team Schalke 04 in June 2019 on a season-long loan. He scored for Die Knappen on his third Bundesliga appearance and was awarded the August 2019 Rookie of the Month award. He made 31 league appearance in 2019-20, scoring twice., before returning to Everton at the end of the season.

Kenny only made eight appearances for Everton in 2020-21 before again going out on loan. He joined Scottish Premiership side  Celtic in February 2021 until the end of the season. Despite being offered a new contract at the end of the 2021–22 season, Kenny opted to leave Everton upon the expiration of his contract, signing a contract to join Hertha BSC through the 2025 season.

International career 
In May 2014, Kenny was part of the England under-17 side that won the 2014 UEFA European Under-17 Championship. In the final, Kenny converted the match-winning penalty in the penalty shoot-out against the Netherlands. He was named in UEFA's team of the tournament.

Kenny was a member of the England squad for the 2016 UEFA European Under-19 Championship, starting in the semi-final defeat against Italy.

Kenny was selected for the England under-20 team in the 2017 FIFA U-20 World Cup. He played in all seven matches of the tournament. In the final England beat Venezuela 1–0, which is England's first win in a global tournament since their World Cup victory of 1966.

In May 2019, Kenny was named in the England Under-21 squad for the UEFA European U-21 Championship in Italy and San Marino. Kenny was among three Everton players that were named as Dominic Calvert-Lewin and Kieran Dowell were also included in the 23-man squad. Kenny scored a stunning strike and England's third during a 3–3 draw with Croatia at the San Marino Stadium on 24 June 2019.

Kenny qualifies for the Republic of Ireland under FIFA's grandparent rule.

Career statistics

Honours
Oxford United
Football League Two runner-up: 2015–16
Football League Trophy runner-up: 2015–16

England U17
UEFA European Under-17 Championship: 2014

England U20
FIFA U-20 World Cup: 2017

England U21
Toulon Tournament: 2018

Individual
UEFA European Under-17 Championship Team of the Tournament: 2014
 Bundesliga Rookie of the Month: August 2019

References

External links

Profile at the Hertha BSC website

1997 births
Living people
Footballers from Liverpool
English footballers
Association football defenders
Everton F.C. players
Wigan Athletic F.C. players
Oxford United F.C. players
FC Schalke 04 players
Celtic F.C. players
Hertha BSC players
English Football League players
Premier League players
Bundesliga players
Scottish Professional Football League players
England youth international footballers
England under-21 international footballers
English expatriate footballers
English expatriate sportspeople in Germany
Expatriate footballers in Germany
English people of Irish descent